Friedrich Jakob Funk was a German Politician of the Christian Social Union (CSU).

Life

Early life and Farming Career 
Funk, who was a Protestant Christian, was a soldier in World War I despite his young age. After the war he studied agriculture in Munich and graduated as a farmer. In 1932 he took over the parental lease in Neuses am Sand, which he acquired in 1936.

Political career 
Friedrich Funk was elected as a non-party candidate in the district council of Gerolzhofen in 1948. He joined the CSU in 1949 after being appointed as a candidate for the Bundestag and had been a member of the German Bundestag since its first election in 1949 until his death in 1963. He was always elected directly to parliament in the constituency of Schweinfurt. From 1953 to 1957, he was deputy chairman of the CSU national group in the CDU / CSU parliamentary group. From 1957 until his death he was deputy chairman of the Bundestag's Committee on Petitions. On May 17, 1963, he was awarded the Bavarian Order of Merit.

See also
List of Bavarian Christian Social Union politicians

References 

1900 births
1963 deaths
People from Kitzingen (district)
Members of the Bundestag for Bavaria
Members of the Bundestag 1961–1965
Members of the Bundestag 1957–1961
Members of the Bundestag 1953–1957
Members of the Bundestag 1949–1953
Members of the Bundestag for the Christian Social Union in Bavaria